Panathinaikos Limassol B.C. is a professional basketball club based in Limassol, Cyprus.

History
The club was founded in 1996 and one season later (1997–98), were promoted to the Division A and ranked 5th. The same season the club played in the FIBA Korać Cup and eliminated in the first round by the then competition runners-up of Crvena zvezda The 1999–2000 season, Panathinaikos Limassol reached the final of Cypriot Basketball Cup where it lost 67–72 by Achilleas Kaimakli.

Honours and achievements
 Cypriot Basketball Cup
 Runners-up (1): 1999–2000

References

Basketball teams in Cyprus
Basketball teams established in 1996
Sport in Limassol